Kerberos Panzer Cop, also known as , is a 1988 to 2000 Kerberos Saga manga written by Mamoru Oshii and illustrated by Kamui Fujiwara (Studio 2B) with mechanical design by Yutaka Izubuchi. This comic series tales events prior to those portrayed in Oshii's 1987 live-action feature film The Red Spectacles. In 1991, Mamoru Oshii directed the movie StrayDog: Kerberos Panzer Cops which is based on the first volume of Kerberos Panzer Cop. The complete comic series was loosely adapted for the screen in the 1999 animated feature Jin-Roh directed by Hiroyuki Okiura and written by Mamoru Oshii.

Part One (Act 1~4) of Kerberos Panzer Cop was published in various Japanese comic magazines from 1988 to 1990, it was later completed with Part Two (Act 5~8) published in Monthly Shōnen Ace from 1999 to 2000. Translated versions of the complete series were issued in South Korea, Hong Kong, Macau, Malaysia and Taiwan in the early 2000s. A sequel named Kerberos Saga: Rainy Dogs was serialized in Ace Tokunoh from 2003 to 2005, then published as an extended single volume in 2005.

An English language adaptation of the first four acts was published under the title Hellhounds: Panzer Cops in 1994 by Dark Horse Comics. The American translators from Studio Protheus, Alan Gleason and Toren Smith, randomly used the alternative titles Hellhounds (Cerberos -sic-: Panzer Cop) and Hellhounds. This adaptation was later issued in the United Kingdom by Diamond Comic Distributors in 1998, and a translated version was published in the German magazine  in 1996.

On April 2010, as a twentieth anniversary of the Original Edition (1990 volume compilation), Gakken publisher will issue Kerberos Panzer Cop a Revision : 20th edition, a planned revised version (Act 1~8) with corrected scenes and "digitally refine" graphics by Kamui Fujiwara. A 16 pages extra Act Kerberos Panzer Cop: Special Issue (前夜-ケルベロス騒乱異聞, zenya - keruberosu souran ibun) was prepublished in Kerberos Panzer Cops: Tokyo War, the Kerberos Saga's definitive guide.

Plot

Kerberos Panzer Cop is more of an anthology of vignettes depicting "incidents", eight acts, all of which contribute to the tale of the closing battles between antigovernment urban guerrilla organizations, such as The Sect, and the Metropolitan Police's (M.P.) Special Armed Garrison nicknamed "", the Greek word for the mythological "Cerberus" hellhound.

The manga ends with the fall of the M.P.'s Special Armed Garrison to the JGSDF's special force "Molosser" during a failed coup d'état in Tokyo. The putschs failing is due to a complex political conspiracy and a harsh struggle for command between rival police administrations. This Kerberos Saga key event is called "Kerberos Riot" (ケルベロス騒乱, keruberosu sōran). Though, three Special Armed Garrison veterans escape, Koichi Todome, Midori Washio and Souichiro Toribe (a.k.a. the Devil's Trio).

During the era of high economic growth, the Metropolitan Police (Shutokei in Japanese, a.k.a. "Capital Police" or "CAPO" in the English adaptation) was born to battle against the anti-government military forces. Especially the conflict between the Special Armed Garrison of the M.P. called "Tokki-tai" was extraordinarily violent. This coloured introductive chapter provides a historical, political and social background of the post-World War II parallel universe Japan. Therefore the building of the Tokyo Tower (1957~1958) as well as the communist students and activists-led (Zengakuren) anti Japan-US Security Treaty protests in front of the National Diet Building (1960) - replaced by fictitious anti Weimar Establishment movement - were both removed from the English adaptation. The Prologue was replaced by a single page synopsis without any illustration nor actual reference to Japan (known as "the country") and its military occupation (1945~1952) by Germany (replacing the United States). William Shakespeare's Julius Caesar quote "Cry 'Havoc!', and let slip the dogs of war" was kept though. However, the Prologue was included in Jin-Roh'''s opening and it was later detailed in Mamoru Oshii's animated feature Tachiguishi-Retsuden.

The opening chapter concerns a new recruit of the Metropolitan Police, Toru Inui, who first fails to kill a suicide bomber in the sewer system and later fails to apprehend a suspicious wounded man in the company of an innocent woman escaping from a manhole. The wounded man is shot by M.P. snipers and is revealed to be an armed terrorist. Inui is reassigned to training and his superiors not only wonder why he failed to shoot, but why he transferred into the unit ("perhaps because of the smell of his own kind", one of many stray dog references in the series). He is sent back into the field and while covering the rear of the patrol, comes across the same woman and another injured man. Before he realizes what is going on, the seemingly innocent woman reveals herself to be a terrorist and shoots Inui dead. This first act was loosely adapted for the screen in Jin-Roh.

The second chapter concerns Hachiro Kishu, a helicopter pilot whose dream has been the thrill of flying and the challenge of aerial combat. Stuck to flying recon and traffic patrol on board an outdated Fa-330 rotorcraft, Kishu gets his chance when the Metropolitan Police's Aerial Squadron (首都圏上空) is issued a new state-of-the-art assault helicopter prototype (Fa-666 "Jagdhund") and he has been assigned to fly it. Meanwhile, outside Metropolitan Police Public Security Division agents are tracking down a mole within the Metropolitan Police, but before they can arrest him and his accomplices, the Kerberos 9th Platoon "Schweißhund" raids an accomplice's house, killing much of the cell, but the mole escapes. When the M.P. Public Security Division agents inform their director Bunmei Muroto, while they have not identified the mole, they uncovered a plot to sabotage the Special Armed Garrison's upcoming aerial demonstration. However, in order to avenge his men who had their mission ruined by the Kerberos, Muroto does not inform the M.P. Defense Division's ("Capital Area Security Police Agency" in the English adaptation) director Isao Aniya and allows the parade to go on. The Sect mole, revealed to be aircraft mechanic within the Aeronautical Experiments Platoon, plants a bomb on board the Jagdhund prototype, which explodes during the aerial demonstration. Kishu can only watch in horror as his dream falls to the ground.

Muroto realized the society has evolved since the days of the Metropolitan Police creation, the Kerberos era's end is inevitable ("there's not enough room for two dogs in one dog house. but if you need the bloodline of both dogs you can resolve the situation by mating them..."). Therefore Muroto works against the M.P. Defense Division's interest throughout the series, although it is unclear if Muroto is doing this out of self-interest or for loftier goals. In addition to letting a terrorist bomb the parade flight of the Special Armed Garrison's Jagdhund helicopter, it is revealed that Muroto is planning to merge his M.P. Public Security Division with the rival Self-Police ("Metropolitan Police Force" and "NPA" are randomly used in the English adaptation) to create "a new public peacekeeping apparatus that has the Public Security Division at its core". A such move implies to dismantle Shiro Tatsumi's Kerberos unit. Knowing that M.P. Defense Division director Isao Aniya may see this as a betrayal after years of faithful service and loyalty and attempt to strike back, Muroto knows that in order for the Metropolitan Police merger to continue, he must publicly discredit or eliminate the Special Armed Garrison. Following a secret meeting with Self-Police Public Security Bureau officials, he confronts an underling, Tsujimura, of leaking secrets to a friend in the Kerberos unit. M.P. Public Security Division agents come to take Tsujimura away, but unmasking director Muroto's ambition ("say, Boss, who is it the dog is supposed to preserve his bloodline for, anyway?") he pulls a gun on him, forcing the agents to kill Tsujimura. This chapter also foreshadows the downfall of the Special Armored Garrison, when a stray dog finds the corpse of Tsujimura in a junkyard, then wanders next to a large pile of discarded Stahlhelm helmets, machineguns, and armored personnel carriers, all presumably from the Kerberos unit, with the gleaming glass office buildings of Tokyo in the background.

The Sect creates a hostage crisis at the German embassy in Japan. If any hostages are killed during the siege, an international incident could erupt. The Kerberos Assault Platoons storm the embassy, eliminating the radicals within minutes. However, the embassy takeover was a diversion by a splinter group of the Sect. The main cell and their leader, Fujiwara, has hijacked a Luft Hansa Focke-Wulf Fw 200 at the Tokyo International Airport (a.k.a. Haneda Airport). It is soon revealed that Fujiwara's splinter cell broke off from the Sect following a series of incidents similar to the Special Armed Garrison: the Sect's leadership, behind bars, has compromised with the government and has abandoned its more extremist and violent members, calling themselves the Four Seasons League. The goal of the splinter faction's hijacking is an appointment with glory with the Kerberos unit.

The Kerberos Assault Platoon unit is charged with the capture of Fujiwara ("No one else is to take him") and is dispatched to Haneda Airport, but soon has a conflict over jurisdiction with the Self-Police, who polices the airport. The jurisdiction conflict comes to a head when the unit commander, Handa, orders the Kerberos unit to ignore the Self-Police's SSG (Spezial Sturm Gruppe, a fictitious special assault unit inspired by the actual GSG 9) blockade, resulting in a public armed standoff inside the airport terminal. The resulting backlash quickly dumps the Kerberos unit on the tarmac, where Handa formulates one last plan to capture Fujiwara. Handa has his unit secure a Volkswagen Type 26 service truck and sends Koichi Todome, Midori Washio, and Souichiro Toribe to infiltrate the Fw 200 as caterers delivering food to the hostages, violating the Self-Police's jurisdiction. If they are caught, they can be arrested and the scandal would destroy the Kerberos unit.

Handa launches a diversion as Koichi, Midori and Soichiro storm the plane and kill most of the splinter faction, but before they can fully secure the plane, Fujiwara orders the pilot to takeoff. Koichi, Midori and Soichiro force the plane down by shooting the engines. The plane crash-lands on a landfill on Showa Island and Fujiwara makes his escape. Koichi and Soichiro are in a daze from the crash, but Midori climbs up on the fuselage and begins setting up her Mauser C96 pistol for long-range shooting. Handa and the rest of the Kerberos unit scramble to the crash site, but are beaten by the Self-Police. Fujiwara meets a wall of Self-Police in riot gear, waiting to apprehend him, but instead of resisting arrest, he turns to face the distant crashed plane and Midori, who shoots him between the eyes.

Tetsurō Kai, the young leader of the Japan Ground Self-Defense Force's (陸上自衛隊) Panzer Jäger Unit (ギア部隊) incorporates the Kerberos organization's Academy Training School (首都警·養成学校) as an undercover trainee. There he meets and falls in love with instructor Midori Washio. Special Armoured Suits Type 61 used by the JGSDF's Panzer Jäger special force (a.k.a. "Molosser") are publicly unveiled during a military parade at the Mount Fuji in December 19XX. The JGSDF's 1st Airborne Brigade (第1空挺団) is modeled after the fictitious World War II German elite unit (with Special Armored Suits Type 34 "Wolfpelz") which fought and eventually defeated the Soviets at the decisive Battle of Stalingrad that turned the tide of war (see Kerberos Panzer Jäger).

The Kerberos organization's reputation worsen further with the Fast Food Grifter Clubbed To Death Case. A Fast Food Grifter (立食師 tachiguishi) that goes by the name Cold Badger Masa is brutally murdered by 7th Platoon "Schäferhund" Kerberos Chuichi Koshiramaru in a stand-and-eat soba, which is called Mach (マッハ軒・立食) as a reference to Ernst Mach. The Self-Police quickly arrests Koshiramaru and rumors of an anti-Kerberos conspiracy starts to emerge. Soon another rumor arise, the existence of a self-preservation underground cell within the Kerberos members called Jin-Roh. The police investigation led by Detective Matsui (from the Patlabor animation TV series and feature films Oshii directed) unveils the existence of Fast Food Grifters among the society, the most famous of them, Moongaze Ginji (from The Red Spectacles), does a cameo. This Act is taglined "Fast Food Grifter Clubbed to Death Case" (マッハ軒立食師撲殺事件異聞) for it is the comic adaptation of radio drama While Waiting for the Red Spectacles's eponymous Third night. This event is later adapted for the screen in Tachiguichi-Retsuden.

When two German officials have to come in Japan on a diplomatic trip, hundreds of anti-Weimar Establishment (ワイマール体制) protesters gather at a bridge junction near the airport. As the Self-Police using rubber bullets is overwhelmed by violent rioters enforcing the security barrage and eventually molesting the diplomatic convoy, standing Kerberos, which were sent in for backup, fire over the protesters. This event becomes a political scandal known as "the incident of the 200 killed" (a.k.a. "Park Incident") and the National Public Safety Committee votes for the Metropolitan Police's dismantlement order. Isao Aniya and Shiro Tatsumi refuse it and instead plan a coup d'état, then Hajime Handa gathers the three Kerberos companies and delivers a rousing speech. The climactic "Kerberos Riot" is about to begin (see February 26 incident).

On February 26 of 19XX, 7:12am, Tokki-tai Captain Tatsumi Shiro led the 1st Company "Kurzhaar" to Kasumigaseki -district of most of Japan's cabinet ministry offices- he was supported by Tokki-tai Vice-Chief Hajime Handa's 2nd Company "Langhaar". Forces were respectively about 22 vehicles per 120 men and 31 vehicles per 180 men. Aerial support was granted by the Tokki-tai Aerial Reconnaissance Platoon "Laelaps" made of 22 men (mechanics and pilots) and 5 Fa-330 rotorcraft. Hachiro Kishu, a.k.a. "Laelaps 4", launched the initial assault against a Self-Police Riot Police patrol at 7:30am. Laelaps attacked a second patrol at 7:33am in a joint-assault with the 1st Company. At 7:55am, the 3rd Company "Drahthaar" led by 9th Platoon "Schweißhund" Platoon Leader Ichirō Kure stormed the Self-Police's (National Police Agency) governmental building (警察庁・庁舎). While succeeding in taking control of the Self-Police's building the 3rd Company was eventually decimated by Bunmei Muroto's agents who freed the hostages. Following these events Muroto drove to the Prime Minister's cabinet, Kantei, to a rendez-vous with Metropolitan Police's (Shutokei) director of division Isao Aniya. At 8:25am refuelling Laelaps was attacked by Self-Police policemen who killed all mechanics and engineers, all five rotorcrafts escaped in extremis though. Laelaps fought back and killed the Self-Police agents. At 8:32am 1st Company and 2nd Company bessieged the Self-Police HQ -Tokyo M.P.D.- (警視庁庁舎) with Laelaps harassing the defenders until Handa ordered the all-out assault. Shortly after, three incoming Japan Air Self-Defense Force (航空自衛隊) fighters Messerschmitt Me 262 A-1j were spotted by Laelaps 4. At 9:05am, Hachiro Tohbe and a fellow 2nd Company veteran instructor are sharing their last cigarette as the Kerberos Academy Training School "Zucht Schanze" is going under siege by the Self-Police's Riot Police. 11:55am, Tatsumi Shiro and Hajime Handa are reporting the situation from the Self-Police director's office before Protect Gear-dressed Shiro prepares to launch the final battle. 12:00am, Shiro exits the Kerberos-held Self-Police HQ which is now under siege by the JGSDF's 1st Airborne Brigade. As Shiro leads his men rushing toward the Panzer Jäger Trooper (Molosser) lines, Tetsurō Kai shouts "fire!!".

Special Issue

The Special Issue tales the following of the "Park Incident" (Act 7) with Midori Washio, Souichiro Toribe, Koichi Todome and Kurosaki.

Related works
The Red SpectaclesKerberos Panzer Cop is a manga adaptation of Mamoru Oshii's 1987's live-action film The Red Spectacles. The motion picture's introduction is the direct sequel of the  event which is fully described in Kerberos Panzer Cop volume 2, act 8.

Stray Dog: Kerberos Panzer CopsStray Dog: Kerberos Panzer Cops is a 1991 live-action film adaptation of Kerberos Panzer Cop volume 1. The motion picture's opening scene is part of the "Kerberos Riot" event which is years later fully described in Kerberos Panzer Cop volume 2, act 8. Also the character named Toru Inui shares some background with act 1's main character, Inui.

Jin-Roh: The Wolf Brigade
The animated feature Jin-Roh is an adaptation of Parts I & II of Kerberos Panzer Cop. Jin-Roh is about a major conspiracy against the Kerberos organization taking part in Tokyo during the 1950s. The main character, Kazuki Fuse, was created after Inui, a Kerberos performed by Yoshikatsu Fujiki, in the 1991 live-action adaptation and also featured in the manga. The manga and original story's Todomo-Washio-Toribe trio was removed and the "Kerberos Riot" event was simplified and replaced by a self conservation unit, the "Jin-Roh Brigade". The original storyboard by Oshii was modified by director Okiura, notably with the addition of romantic scenes.

Kerberos Saga: Rainy DogsKerberos Saga Rainy Dogs is a manga sequel, serialized from 2003 to 2004 in Ace Tokunoh magazine. It was published as a single volume in 2005 by Kadokawa Shoten.

Issues
Various editions and reissues were released since 1988 to present day. Not only the paper size differs from one issue to another but also the bonus material.

Magazine serializations, Original, Complete and Kerberos Saga editions are standard B5 (25.7 cm x 18.2 cm / 10.1" x 7.2"). Popular edition is A5 size (21 cm x 14.8 cm) and Frozen edition is B6 size (18 cm x 13 cm). Additional contents such as prologues, production notes, scenarios, organization charts, glossary, staff interviews and bibliographies are always included in tankōbon editions to explain the Kerberos Saga's complex background.

Amazing Comics serialization (Act1~2 / B5)Kerberos Panzer Cop was first published in October 1988 through Amazing Comics (アメージング·コミックス), a Science fiction/Horror two-monthly comics magazine published from 1988 to 1989 by Kasakura Shuppansha.

Combat Comic serialization (Act1~4 / B5)
After Amazing Comics last issue in April 1989, Kerberos Panzer Cop: Part I serialization restarted in Combat Comic (コンバットコミック), a monthly SF and Fantasy comic magazine published from 1985 to 1990 by Nihon Shuppansha. Part One (Act1~4) was completed in July 1990.

Original edition (Part I / B5)
In December 1990 Nihon Shuppansha compiled Kerberos Panzer Cop: Part One in a single paperback volume with the original cheap paper quality and B5 size kept (25.7 cm x 18.2 cm). This original edition features a curved silver dust jacket cover. A white obi strip promoting the StrayDog theatrical adaptation's March 1991 roadshow ("映画化公開決定!") was included over the dust jacket cover.

Popular edition (Part I / A5)
Re-issue of the 1990 Original edition by Nihon Shuppansha. Paper size is smaller than the original B5 edition (now 21 cm x 14.8 cm) but the paper quality is a bit better. Half of the bonus material was removed though for a budget release.

Monthly Shōnen Ace serialization (Act5~8 / B5)
The sequel and completion of Kerberos Panzer Cop, featuring Acts 5~8 (第二部, Part 2) was published in Monthly Shōnen Ace (月刊少年エース, Gekkan Shōnen Esu) monthly comics magazine, property of Kadokawa Shoten. Kerberos Panzer Cop was completed in January 2000.

Frozen edition (Part I & II / B6)
The "Frozen version" is a 2-volume renewal edition. The first volume is a reissue of the 1993 Popular edition, though it is a smaller format (18 cm x 13 cm) but the paper quality is even better (supercalendered). The second volume is the first ever compilation of Kerberos Panzer Cop Part II. It is dubbed "Conclusion" and was issued as a 10th anniversary of the Original edition, and also to coincide with the release of the theatrical adaptation, Jin-Roh, in Japan. Both volumes were issued within illustrator Kamui Fujiwara's works collection reissue.

Complete edition (Part I & II / B5+CD)
The Zen edition is a boxset reissue of the Frozen version including Acts 1~8 in a +400 pages single volume bundled with goodies. As a collector item it was packaged in a white carton box bearing a "Zen" sticker and including a deluxe black carton boxset (with grey obi), three original B5 postcards, the drama CD version of While Waiting for the Red Spectacles ("Radio Kerberos"), the revised script for While Waiting for the Red Spectacles and various appendices. A limited Kerberos Panzer Cop Kubrick (Protect-Gear '92) was offered to first print pre-orderers on Kadokawa's website. The "Zen" (literally "complete book") edition was produced in small quantities sold 5,800¥ (+51$).

Kerberos Saga edition (Part I / B5)
Single act releases reissue in B5 format by Barque (Raiden company) through the Kerberos Saga official website. Kerberos Panzer Cops (with the plural form as in the live-action film StrayDog) is used instead of the original title Kerberos Panzer Cop''.

References

External links
Kerberos saga official website 

1988 manga
Dark Horse Comics titles
Kadokawa Shoten manga
Kerberos saga
Seinen manga